Computational mathematics is an area of mathematics devoted to the interaction between mathematics and computer computation. 

A large part of computational mathematics consists roughly of using mathematics for allowing and improving computer computation in areas of science and engineering where mathematics are useful. This involves in particular algorithm design, computational complexity, numerical methods and computer algebra.

Computational mathematics refers also to the use of computers for mathematics itself. This includes mathematical experimentation for establishing conjectures (particularly in number theory), the use of computers for proving theorems (for example the four color theorem), and the design and use of proof assistants.

Areas of computational mathematics
Computational mathematics emerged as a distinct part of applied mathematics by the early 1950s. Currently, computational mathematics can refer to or include:
 Computational science, also known as scientific computation or computational engineering
 Solving mathematical problems by computer simulation as opposed to analytic methods of applied mathematics
 Numerical methods used in scientific computation, for example numerical linear algebra and numerical solution of partial differential equations
 Stochastic methods, such as Monte Carlo methods and other representations of uncertainty in scientific computation
 The mathematics of scientific computation, in particular numerical analysis, the theory of numerical methods
 Computational complexity
 Computer algebra and computer algebra systems
 Computer-assisted research in various areas of mathematics, such as logic (automated theorem proving), discrete mathematics, combinatorics, number theory, and computational algebraic topology
 Cryptography and computer security, which involve, in particular, research on primality testing, factorization, elliptic curves, and mathematics of blockchain
 Computational linguistics, the use of mathematical and computer techniques in natural languages
 Computational algebraic geometry
 Computational group theory
 Computational geometry
 Computational number theory
 Computational topology
 Computational statistics
 Algorithmic information theory
 Algorithmic game theory
 Mathematical economics, the use of mathematics in economics, finance and, to certain extents, of accounting.
 Experimental mathematics

See also

References

Further reading

External links
 Foundations of Computational Mathematics, a non-profit organization
 International Journal of Computer Discovered Mathematics

 
Applied mathematics
Computational science